The Halifax Explosion was a disaster caused by munitions explosion in 1917 in Halifax Harbour, Nova Scotia.

Halifax Explosion may also refer to:
 Halifax Explosion (drink) or Rev-Bomb, introduced 2000, a cocktail
 Halifax Pop Explosion, started in 1993, an annual music festival

See also
Shattered City: The Halifax Explosion, a 2003 TV miniseries on the disaster
Shattered City: The Halifax Explosion and the Road to Recovery, a 1989 book on the disaster